The Beaufort is a substantial GRP sailing dinghy, with round bilges (appearing similar to a carvel smooth hull, a mainsail and a jib.

It was designed by Ian Proctor c. 1965.  It's a relatively stable cruising dinghy, and is equipped with a metal centreplate.

The Beaufort sail mark is a trumpet with a black square beneath and a white "B" within the black square.

References

Dinghies
Boats designed by Ian Proctor